Walki is a village in Rahata taluka of Ahmednagar district in the Indian state of Maharashtra.

Population
As per 2011 census, population of village is 8,203. 4,329 are male and 3,874 are female.

Economy
Main occupation of village is agriculture and allied work.

Transport

Road
Walki is connected to nearby cities and villages by village roads.

Rail
Shirdi is nearest railway station to village.

Air
Shirdi Airport is the nearest airport to village.

See also
List of villages in Rahata taluka

References 

Villages in Ahmednagar district